James Kevin Casey (1824–1909) was an Irish priest in Ballygar and Athleague and principal of St John's seminary in Sligo.  He composed many didactic poems which were popular and published in collections.  Their subjects included materialism, devotion, the Irish language and, most especially, temperance.  An example is a verse of The Toper and his Bottle,

Casey was an inspiration for the "Poet of the Pick", Jem Casey, a character in Flann O'Brien's satirical novel At Swim-Two-Birds.  Jem Casey was a labourer who wrote "pomes" such as The Workman's Friend,

References

Irish temperance activists
1824 births
1909 deaths
Alumni of St Patrick's College, Maynooth
Irish poets
19th-century Irish Roman Catholic priests